András Sárközy (born  in Budapest) is a Hungarian mathematician, working in analytic and combinatorial number theory, although his first works were in the fields of geometry and classical analysis.  He has the largest number of papers co-authored with Paul Erdős (a total of 62); he has an Erdős number of one. He proved the Furstenberg–Sárközy theorem that every sequence of natural numbers with positive upper density contains two members whose difference is a full square. He was elected a corresponding member (1998), and a full member (2004) of the Hungarian Academy of Sciences. He received the Széchenyi Prize (2010). He is the father of the mathematician Gábor N. Sárközy.

References 
 

Living people
1941 births
Mathematicians from Budapest
Members of the Hungarian Academy of Sciences
Number theorists